Uchanie-Kolonia  is a village in the administrative district of Gmina Uchanie, within Hrubieszów County, Lublin Voivodeship, in eastern Poland. Among locals, it is commonly known as Malarzówka.

References

Uchanie-Kolonia